Kaundinya I (Odia: କୌଣ୍ଡିନ୍ୟ), also known as Hùntián (混塡) and Preah Thong (Khmer: ព្រះថោង), son of king Adityavamsa “Intapah” who was banished from Indraprastha, located about 20 miles south of Dehli, India. He was the second monarch of Funan (reigned c. 1st century) which comprises much of Cambodia located in mainland Southeast Asia centered on the Mekong Delta. He was the consort of the first monarch Soma, Queen of Funan, also known as Liǔyè (Chinese) and Neang Neak (Khmer) and together both were the co-founders of the kingdom of Funan with the capital located at Vyadhapura.

Indian origins
Numerous sources and folklores talk about the arrival of the merchant Brahmin. 
 Kaundinya from India and the subsequent marriage with the Naga princess Soma leading to the establishment of the kingdom. But the sources mostly point to Kaundinya's arrival from India without clearly describing his origins which later acquires numerous legendary characteristics contributing to different folklores from numerous sources which is reflected from the Chinese and other regional Southeast Asian sources. The union is symbolised in the personification of Khmer culture as Preah Thong and Neang Neak.

The history of maritime links along with the inscriptions analysis corresponding to the region can provide insights into the origins of Kaundinya in India. Sanjeev Sanyal's book The Ocean of Churn: How the Indian Ocean Shaped Human History further looks into the origin of the name Kaundinya, which is not usually a common first name in India but a gotra (i.e. derived from guru) of a group of Brahmins who lived on the eastern coastline of India especially along the Odisha-Andhra-Tamil coastline. Hence this corresponds to the ancient Kalinga region (now modern Odisha) considering the early Indian mariners were trading from this region as evident from their ancient maritime history around 3rd century BC and the port of Palur (near Ganjam) which was referred to by Ptolemy as a prominent international port during the 2nd century CE. The links with Kalinga are also noted from the copper plate land grants given by the rulers of Kalinga to Kaundinya Brahmins who lived in the Mahendragiri region of Ganjam with the most notable one being the Ragolu inscription copper plate grant issued by the ruler Nandaprabhanjanavarman of the Pitrbhakta dynasty, the Shaivite customs mentioned in the Chinese work History of the Southern Dynasties during the reign of Kaundinya's descendant Jayavarman Kaundinya with regards to Mount Mo-tan in Funan, bearing affinity with the early Saivism and its relation to Mahendragiri mountain which was the prevalent religion during the reign of different dynasties of Kalinga and the diplomatic relations between Funan and the Murunda dynasty of northern Kalinga during 3rd cen CE, when King Dhamadamadhara (Dharmatamadharasya) of Murunda received envoy Su-Wu representing King Fan Chan of Funan (225-250 CE).

Foundation of Funan and establishing the House of Kaundinya
As per the legends, an Indian merchant ship was attacked by the pirates led by Soma, daughter of the chieftain of the local Nāga clan. The merchants led by Kaundinya fought back and fended off the attackers but the ship had been damaged and was beached for repairs. The Indians were wary of a second attack but Princess Soma was impressed by Kaundinya's bravery and proposed marriage which was accepted. The union led to the foundation of the House which would rule Funan for many generations and the royal legitimacy of the dynasty was acquired through the female line (i.e. the matrilineal lineage) in the kingdom. The founding myth also explains the reason why the serpent(naga) became an important part of Khmer iconography as is seen thousand years later when this mystical union remained an important part of the court ceremonies at Angkor during the era of the Khmer empire.

References

1st-century Cambodian monarchs
Cambodian Hindus
1st-century Hindus
Indian emigrants to Cambodia
Kalinga (India)
History of Odisha
Funan